Nanjil Sampath is an Indian politician and public speaker in the regional Dravida Munnetra Kazhagam political party in Indian state of Tamil Nadu. He has also acted in a few Tamil movies.

Early life 
He was born to Baskaran and Gomathi in Manalikarai (Manalikkara), Kothanallur panchayat, division, Kalkulam taluk, Kanyakumari district, Tamil Nadu. He completed his schooling at St. Mary Goretty School, Manalikarai and his M.A and M.Phil degrees from South Travancore Hindu College. "Nanjil" in his name denotes his home district, Kanyakumari.

Political career
Sampath started his political career in Marumalarchi Dravida Munnetra Kazhagam (MDMK) in 1993, which he left in 2012. He joined All India Anna Dravida Munnetra Kazhagam (AIADMK) in 2012. He served as deputy propaganda secretary from when he joined until 1 February 2016. He left AIADMK on 3 January 2017 when V. K. Sasikala was elected to lead the party, only to rejoin on 7 January 2017.  For a brief period in 2017 until 2018 he was with the AIADMK'S breakaway Amma Makkal Munnetra Kazhagam (AMMK). He later joined and campaigned for the Dravida Munnetra Kazhagam (DMK) in the 2019 general elections.

Filmography

Notes

References

People from Kanyakumari district
Tamil Nadu politicians by party
Dravida Munnetra Kazhagam politicians
Living people
Year of birth missing (living people)